DR2 may refer to:

 Dead Rising 2, a 2010 video game
 Danganronpa 2: Goodbye Despair, a 2012 video game
 DR-2, a highway in the Dominican Republic
 DR2 register, a debug register of x86 processors
 DR2 (car), an Italian automobile by DR Motor Company
 Demolition Records, a UK based record label
 DR P2, a Danish radio station from DR
 DR2, a Danish television channel from DR
 Gaia Data Release 2, the second publication of astrometric data
 DR2 (DR for "Dreieckrechner"), a German flight computer manufactured as of 1936